Ian Baas (born 1983 in Noblesville, Indiana) is an American race car driver.

He raced in the American Le Mans Series in 2005 for the Alex Job Finishing Second twice in the #24 GT class Porsche 996 RSR The first podium came at Mosport and the second at the prestigious [Petite Le Mans]. He has previously raced in US Formula Ford (2003–2004).

In January 2006, Baas won the GT class in the Rolex 24 Hours of Daytona with TPC racing in the #36 Ajilon Consulting Porsche 911 GT3 cup alongside Randy Pobst, Spencer Pumpelly and Michael Levitas. The team finished a remarkable 9th overall out of the 70-car field.

For 2007, Baas drove at Speed Porsche 997 in Rolex GT with co-driver Bob Miller. Also that season, he drove in the Stasis Audi A4 in Speed World Challenge Touring Car, racing against old teammate Randy Pobst.

In 2009 KONI Challenge Series driving a Volkswagen GTI for APR Motorsport Finished fifth in Street Tuner points standings, winning first career KONI race at Barber Motorsports Park with co-driver Josh Hurley and APR Motorsport. Overall, four podiums two top 10s, led season-high 189 of 919 laps (more than 20 percent) and earned class-high three pole positions.

2010 Ian is competing once again for APR motorsport. but this time in the Continental Tire Sports Car Challenge GS class in the all new 2010 Audi S4.

Complete motorsports results

American Open-Wheel racing results
(key) (Races in bold indicate pole position, races in italics indicate fastest race lap)

Complete USF2000 National Championship results

External links 
 Official Website

1980s births
Living people
American Le Mans Series drivers
European Le Mans Series drivers
People from Noblesville, Indiana
Racing drivers from Indiana
Racing drivers from Indianapolis
Rolex Sports Car Series drivers
Porsche Supercup drivers
24 Hours of Daytona drivers
U.S. F2000 National Championship drivers

Porsche Carrera Cup Germany drivers